= Ottapparai =

- city
- Location in Tamil Nadu, India Ottapparai (India)
- Coordinates: 11°11′37″N 77°35′47″E
- Country: India
- State: Tamil Nadu
- District: Erode

Population (2001)
  - Total: 9,216

Languages
  - Official: Tamil
- Time zone: UTC+5:30 (IST)

Ottapparai is a census town in Erode district in the Indian state of Tamil Nadu.

== Demographics ==
As of 2001 India census, Ottapparai had a population of 9216. Males constitute 69% of the population and females 31%. Ottapparai has an average literacy rate of 61%, higher than the national average of 59.5%: male literacy is 71%, and female literacy is 50%. In Ottapparai, 11% of the population is under 6 years of age.
